The Silver Moon Bookshop was a feminist bookstore on Charing Cross Road in London founded in 1984 by Jane Cholmeley and Sue Butterworth, its name derived from the two symbols of womanhood from a poem by Sappho.

In 1989 Silver Moon Bookshop won the Pandora Award for "contributing most to promoting the status of women in publishing and related trades". In 1990 Cholmeley and Butterworth established an associated publishing business, Silver Moon Books. After 17 years, rising rents from the Soho Housing Association forced the shop to close on November 18, 2001. It was then incorporated into Foyles bookshop, till 2004, when the Silver Moon department closed.

See also
Independent bookstore
Gay's the Word (bookshop)
Sisterwrite

References

 

Bookshops in London
Feminist bookstores
Feminism in England
Independent bookshops of the United Kingdom
Buildings and structures in the City of Westminster
Bookstores established in the 20th century
Retail companies established in 1984
Retail companies disestablished in 2001
Feminist organisations in the United Kingdom
Women in London